The Cleveland mayoral election of 1937 saw the reelection of Harold Hitz Burton.

General election

References

Mayoral elections in Cleveland
Cleveland mayoral
Cleveland
November 1937 events
1930s in Cleveland